The  (from change group) command may be used by unprivileged users on various operating systems to change the group associated with a file system object (such as a computer file, directory, or link) to one of which they are a member. A file system object has 3 sets of access permissions, one set for the owner, one set for the group and one set for others. Changing the group of an object could be used to change which users can write to a file.

History
The  command was originally developed as part of the Unix operating system by AT&T Bell Laboratories.

It is also available in the Plan 9 and Inferno operating systems and in most Unix-like systems.

The  command has also been ported to the IBM i operating system.

Syntax
 chgrp [options] group FSO

 The group parameter specifies the new group with which the files or directories should be associated. It may either be a symbolic name or an identifier.
 The FSO specifies one or more file system objects, which may be the result of a glob expression like .

Frequently implemented options
 recurse through subdirectories.

 verbosely output names of objects changed. Most useful when  is a list.

 force or forge ahead with other objects even if an error is encountered.

Example
$ ls -l *.conf
-rw-rw-r--   1 gbeeker  wheel          3545 Nov 04 2011  prog.conf
-rw-rw-r--   1 gbeeker  wheel          3545 Nov 04 2011  prox.conf
$ chgrp staff *.conf
$ ls -l *.conf
-rw-rw-r--   1 gbeeker  staff          3545 Nov 04 2011  prog.conf
-rw-rw-r--   1 gbeeker  staff          3545 Nov 04 2011  prox.conf

See also
 chmod
 chown
 Group identifier (Unix)
 List of Unix commands
 id (Unix)

References

External links

 
 
 

Operating system security
Standard Unix programs
Unix SUS2008 utilities
Plan 9 commands
Inferno (operating system) commands
IBM i Qshell commands

de:Unix-Kommandos#Benutzer- und Rechteverwaltung